Om Namo Bhagavate Vāsudevāya (Devanagari: ॐ नमो भगवते वासुदेवाय)  is one of the most popular Hindu mantras, and according to the Bhagavata tradition, the most important mantra in Vaishnavism. It is called the Dvadasakshari Mantra, or simply Dvadasakshari, meaning the "twelve-syllable" mantra, dedicated to Vishnu and Krishna both. It has two traditions—Tantric and Puranic. In the Tantric tradition, the rishi of the mantra is Prajapati; in the Puranic tradition, the rishi is Narada. Both refer to it as the supreme Vishnu mantra.

Origin 
Bhagavatism, one of the traditions that was assimilated with what would become Vaishnavism, revered the Vrishni heroes, primary among them being Vāsudeva (Krishna). It may be concluded that the mantra was first associated with the reverence of Vāsudeva as the supreme deity before he was syncretised with Vishnu, after which it became an invocation of both deities.

Meaning
Om Namo Bhagavate Vasudevaya means "Om, I bow to Lord Vāsudeva or Lord Vishnu".

Significance 
Om Namo Bhagavate Vāsudevaya means "prostration to Vasudeva", who is variously understood as Krishna an incarnation of Vishnu." According to the Bhagavad Gita, Krishna himself asked his devotees to completely surrender to him:
The Vaishnava Upanishads state that this mantra is described on the Sudarshana Chakra:

The Sharada Tilaka, a Tantric text, states:

Similarly, this is referred to as the ultimate mantra in the Shrimad Bhagavatam. This twelve syllable mantra is known as a mukti (liberation) mantra, and a spiritual formula for attaining freedom. The mantra can also be found in the Vishnu Purana.

In popular culture
Dhruva used this as his mantra in his penance. Dhruva was initiated by Narada into chanting.
Swami Vivekananda used this phrase multiple times in his lectures and letters.
Swami Sivananda suggested to repeat mantras like Om or "Om Namo Bhagavate Vasudevaya".
Vedanta philosopher Dayananda Saraswati wrote a book named "Om Namo Bhagavate Vasudevaya".
 Willow Smith  and Jahnavi Harrison put this mantra into their song Gajendra from their collaborative album RISE

See also

Hare Krishna (mantra)
Dwadashaakshara Mantra
Svayam Bhagavan
Om Namo Narayanaya
Om Tat Sat

References

Hindu mantras
Krishna
Vaishnavism
Om mantras